Rasalgad is a fort in the Maharashtra state of India. It lies 15 km east of Khed City. The fort has been developed as tourist attraction. Its fortification in good condition. The fort lied on a south end of a narrow spur which joins with Suamargad and Mahipatgad in the north direction. In 2003 the fort was declared a protected monument by the Archaeological Survey of India.

History
Very little history is known about this fort. This fort was in the captivity of Morè (clan) of Javli from whom Shivaji Maharaj captured this fort. In 1818 British forces captured it from the Peshwas

Places to see
The fort has a rush of visitors on weekends. It is on a small triangular plateau of five acres, fortified on all the sides. The two entrance gates are in good condition. There is a Veer Maruti idol near the first gate. There is a Zolayidevi temple on the fort with a stone Deepmala and Tulsi Vrindavan in the front. There are two large rock cut water cisterns on the fort. There are 16 cannons on the fort. There is a storeroom in good condition. Chakdev and Parvatgad are seen from the Fort.
Earlier, based on the above information, it was recorded that there were only 16 guns on the fort. The 17th cannon was half broken in front of the granary.
Then on 23rd January 2022, the Sahyadri Pratishthan took out the 18th cannon which was lying in the valley 400 feet east of the fort and placed it in front of the Zolai Devi temple on the fort. Then on March 6, 2022, the 19th cannon was found in a 150-foot valley below the Peer Buruja on the west side of the fort. This performance was done by Sahyadri Pratishthan Khed Vibhaga. cannon no.18 and 19 Information was provided to the state Archaeological Department.

How to reach
The village Rasalwadi is located at the foothill. It is well connected by road. It takes about 10 minutes to reach the fort from Rasalwadi. The temple on the fort is favourite amongst the trekkers for night halt. The journey to the Suamargad-Mahipatgad trek begins from the Rasalgad.

Gallery

See also 
 List of forts in Maharashtra
 List of forts in India
 Ratnagiri
 Marathi People
 List of Maratha dynasties and states
 Maratha War of Independence
 Battles involving the Maratha Empire
 Maratha titles
 Military history of India
 List of people involved in the Maratha Empire

Buildings and structures of the Maratha Empire

Ratnagiri district
Forts in Ratnagiri district
16th-century forts in India
Caves of Maharashtra
Tourist attractions in Pune district
Former populated places in India

References